Zhou Zhennan (Chinese: 周震南; born 21 June 2000) is a Chinese rapper, singer, songwriter and dancer. He finished first in Tencent's Produce Camp 2019 and debuted with R1SE.

Early life
Born on June 21, 2000, Zhou attended Chengdu Meishi International School.

Career

Pre-debut
Zhou trained under JYP Entertainment as a trainee from August 2014 to 2017, before coming back to China for his debut.

2017–2018: Career beginnings
Zhou was a contestant in The Coming One and was placed fourth overall. Zhou released his debut EP V on 14 December 2018. It was announced that Zhou would join the cast of Let Go of My Baby alongside rapper Jackson Wang and other fellow artistes. Zhou, together with South Korean singer Samuel collaborated and participated in Tencent's The Collaboration Season 2. The duo eventually placed first and won the competition. Zhou won the Best Music Newcomer award in "Tencent Supernova Night Awards" on 30 January 2018.

2019–present: V's Prelude and Produce Camp 2019

Zhou released his second EP, V's Prelude on 26 February 2019, consisting of three tracks. It was announced that Zhou, together with a few other trainees, will be representing WAJIJIWA Entertainment on Chinese reality boy band survival show Produce Camp 2019. His performances were well received from fans and has consistently placed first by votes on the show. He debuted with R1SE with the center position on the final episode after finishing in first place.

In 2020, He ranked 46th on Forbes China Celebrity 100 list.

Discography

Extended plays

Singles

Filmography

Television shows

Awards and nominations

References

External links
 Zhou Zhennan on Sina Weibo

2000 births
Living people
R1SE members
Chinese television personalities
Writers from Chongqing
Singers from Chongqing
Chinese male singer-songwriters
Chinese male rappers
Chinese male dancers
Produce 101 (Chinese TV series) contestants